This is a list of long noncoding RNA databases, which provide information about lncRNAs.

Long non-coding RNA databases

References 

17. Seifuddin, F., Singh, K., Suresh, A. et al. lncRNAKB, a knowledgebase of tissue-specific functional annotation and trait association of long noncoding RNA.                    Sci Data 7, 326 (2020). https://doi.org/10.1038/s41597-020-00659-z

Genetics databases
RNA
RNA
Non-coding RNA